The 2001 All-Ireland Minor Hurling Championship was the 71st staging of the All-Ireland Minor Hurling Championship, the Gaelic Athletic Association's premier under-18 inter-county hurling tournament. The championship began on 21 April 2001 and ended on 9 September 2001.

Galway were the defending champions and were hoping to win a third successive championship.

On 9 September 2001, Cork won the championship following a 2-10 to 1-8 defeat of Galway in the All-Ireland final. This was their 18th All-Ireland title, their first in three championship seasons. It remains their last All-Ireland victory.

Cork's Kieran Murphy was the championship's top scorer with 5-28.

Results

Leinster Minor Hurling Championship

Round robin

Semi-finals

Final

Munster Minor Hurling Championship

Quarter-finals

Semi-finals

Final

Ulster Minor Hurling Championship

Semi-final

Final

All-Ireland Minor Hurling Championship

Quarter-finals

Semi-finals

Final

Championship statistics

Top scorers

Top scorers overall

Top scorers in a single game

References

External links
 All-Ireland Minor Hurling Championship: Roll Of Honour

3
All-Ireland Minor Hurling Championship